Calambus bipustulatus is a species of click beetles native to Europe.

References

Elateridae
Beetles described in 1767
Beetles of Europe
Taxa named by Carl Linnaeus